In Aztec mythology, the  ( or, the plural) were the gods of the southern stars.

Aztec gods
Stellar gods
Aztec mythology and religion
Mesoamerican mythology and religion